The women's 400 metres event  at the 2002 European Athletics Indoor Championships was held on March 1–3.

Medalists

Results

Heats
The first 3 of each heat qualified directly (Q) for the final.

Final

References
Results

400 metres at the European Athletics Indoor Championships
400
2002 in women's athletics